The United States Special Envoy for Northern Ireland  (officially the Special Envoy of the President and the Secretary of State for Northern Ireland) is the top U.S. diplomat supporting the Northern Ireland peace process. The position is held by Joe Kennedy III, appointed by president Joe Biden on December 19, 2022.

Origins

Before the 1980s, U.S. leaders were reluctant to get involved in the Troubles in Northern Ireland. When Bill Clinton was on the campaign trail as the Democratic candidate for President in 1992, he suggested both orally and in a letter to Congressman Bruce Morrison that he would favor the appointment of a Special Envoy for Northern Ireland. Clinton was not alone in supporting a more active U.S. involvement in Northern Ireland. On February 23, 1993, shortly after Clinton assumed office as President, Representative Joseph P. Kennedy, together with 16 co-sponsors, sponsored a Congressional Resolution calling for the appointment of a Special Envoy. The Resolution called that it be:

However, the proposed Resolution initially came to nothing. Nevertheless, Clinton discussed the prospect of appointing a Special Envoy with the Irish premier, Albert Reynolds when the two leaders first met on St. Patrick's Day in 1993. However Clinton deferred any appointment. When the Provisional Irish Republican Army (IRA) declared a ceasefire in 1994, Sinn Féin party leader, Gerry Adams urged Washington to play a "nudging role" as it did in South Africa and the Middle East. Congressman Bruce Morrison was considered a potential candidate.

George Mitchell

Bill Clinton's 1992 campaign promise to appoint a peace envoy to Belfast initially "infuriated" the British Government.  No appointment was made until 1995, when Clinton selected former U.S. Senator George J. Mitchell as Special Envoy.  Mitchell was recognised as being more than a token envoy but someone representing a President with a deep interest in events. However, around the time of Mitchell's appointment, it was agreed with both the Prime Minister of the United Kingdom John Major and Taoiseach John Bruton that Mitchell would chair an international commission on disarmament of paramilitary groups. Mitchell went on to successfully chair the talks that resulted in the Good Friday Agreement.

Later envoys
The United States has continued to support the full implementation of the Good Friday Agreement and has demonstrated its readiness to assist the process in any way. On June 10, 2003, President George W. Bush announced his intention to designate Ambassador Richard N. Haass as the Special Envoy. Haass was an active Envoy. In 2001, within a week of the September 11 attacks, Haass warned Irish Republicans that the suspected links between the IRA and Colombian terrorist groups could have "potentially serious consequences for the role of the United States in the peace process". Later, Haass attacked then Ulster Unionist Party leader David Trimble for setting a deadline for pulling out of power-sharing, accusing him of adding to a sense of crisis.

Later, Mitchell Reiss was appointed as the Special Envoy. At the invitation of the British and Irish governments, Reiss participated in the peace process negotiations that took place at Leeds Castle in 2004. On February 15, 2007, Paula Dobriansky, U.S. Undersecretary for Democracy and Global Affairs at the State Department, was named the Special Envoy for Northern Ireland. The transition from the former Special Envoy, Ambassador Mitchell Reiss, took place on February 15, 2007. In February 2008, Special Envoy Dobriansky led a trade mission to Belfast. Until the inauguration of Donald Trump, the Special Envoy was former Colorado Senator, Gary Hart. On March 6, 2020, President Trump appointed his former acting Chief of Staff Mick Mulvaney to fill this position.

Each of the Special Envoys has periodically reported to U.S. Congressional committees on their activities and the status of the Northern Ireland peace process and other matters concerning Northern Ireland.

Future

The United States has at times contemplated whether to terminate the position of U.S. Special Envoy for Northern Ireland. In 2001, then U.S. Secretary of State Colin Powell stated in response to questions that:

During the 2008 U.S. presidential campaign in the United States, Democratic Party candidate Barack Obama was reported in The Irish Times as having questioned the necessity to keep a U.S. Special Envoy for Northern Ireland. This drew a robust response from the Republican Party candidate, Senator John McCain, who strongly backed retaining a U.S. Special Envoy for Northern Ireland. The Senator criticized Senator Obama's position as demonstrating a willingness:

The position became vacant on January 7, 2021, following the resignation of special ambassador, Mick Mulvaney, who resigned in response to President Donald Trump's role in the 2021 storming of the United States Capitol. Almost two years later, President Joe Biden appointed former U.S. Representative Joe Kennedy III of Massachusetts to the position in December 2022.

List

References

 
History of Northern Ireland
Foreign relations of the United States
Northern Ireland peace process
Ireland–United States relations
United Kingdom–United States relations